During the 1995–96 season, Leeds United A.F.C. competed in the FA Premier League.

Season summary
Leeds began the season in good form, with a Tony Yeboah hat-trick giving them an away win over AS Monaco in their UEFA Cup opener. But their European campaign was short-lived, and with the league title soon looking like an unrealistic target, their best hope of success was in the Coca-Cola Cup. They reached the final to claim their first cup final appearance since the 1975 European Cup Final, only to be defeated, losing 3–0 to Aston Villa.

The Wembley defeat triggered a six-match losing run in the Premier League, and drew 0–0 with Coventry on the final day of the season, avoiding matching their own club record run of league defeats and gifting survival to their opponents.

Howard Wilkinson then spent a substantial sum on new players in the summer, bringing in Nigel Martyn, Ian Rush and Lee Sharpe in hope of making Leeds contenders for the league title for the first time in five years.

Final league table

Results summary

Results by round

Results
Leeds United's score comes first

Legend

FA Premier League

FA Cup

League Cup

UEFA Cup

Squad

Left club during season

Reserve squad

Statistics

Appearances and goals

|-
! colspan=14 style=background:#dcdcdc; text-align:center| Goalkeepers

|-
! colspan=14 style=background:#dcdcdc; text-align:center| Defenders

|-
! colspan=14 style=background:#dcdcdc; text-align:center| Midfielders

|-
! colspan=14 style=background:#dcdcdc; text-align:center| Forwards

|-
! colspan=14 style=background:#dcdcdc; text-align:center| Players transferred out during the season

|}

Starting 11
Considering starts in all competitions
 GK: #1,  John Lukic, 44
 RB: #22,  Gary Kelly, 51
 CB: #12,  John Pemberton, 24
 CB: #18,  David Wetherall, 51
 LB: #3,  Tony Dorigo, 26
 RM: #10,  Gary McAllister, 54
 CM: #4,  Carlton Palmer, 49
 CM: #22,  Mark Ford, 21
 LM: #11,  Gary Speed, 44
 CF: #21,  Tony Yeboah, 39
 CF: #9,  Brian Deane, 41

Transfers and loans

Transfers in 

†Club record transfer fee at the time.

Transfers out 

Total spending:  £2,650,000

Loaned in

Loaned out

Notes

References

Leeds United F.C. seasons
Leeds United
Foot